Class 12 may refer to:

 British Rail Class 12, a British diesel locomotive class.
 DRG Class 12, a German steam locomotive class comprising the following eight-coupled, express locomotives operated by the Deutsche Reichsbahn:
 Class 12.0: BBÖ 214
 Class 12.1: BBÖ 114
 SNCB Type 12, a Belgian steam locomotive
 SNCB Class 12, a Belgian electric locomotive